Jing Xiang (born 12 February 1993) is a Chinese German actress.

Biography
Jing Xiang was born in Berlin. She speaks native German and Chinese, and speaks English as a foreign language. From 2009 to 2012 she took acting, dancing and singing lessons at the Academy art school in Berlin-Kreuzberg. Afterwards she studied at the Rostock University of Music and Theatre, graduating in 2017 with an Artist Diploma. During her studies Xiang had guest performances at the Rostock People's Theatre.

Xiang became a member of the Schauspielhaus Bochum ensemble in 2018. Among other roles, she played the first gravedigger in Johan Simons’ Hamlet production, which had been invited to the 57th Berliner Theatertreffen. Xiang also took a role in a Tatort episode  and in a  series. She became known to a larger audience through the Netflix series Biohackers, in which she plays the role of Chen-Lu.

Filmography

References

External links
 Jing Xiang at Agentur Hilde Stark
 Jing Xiang at Schauspielhaus Bochum
 
 

Living people
1993 births
21st-century German actresses
21st-century Chinese actresses
German stage actresses
Chinese stage actresses
German television actresses
Chinese television actresses
Actresses from Berlin
People from Rostock
People from Bochum
German people of Chinese descent